Hôtel Barrière Le Fouquet's Paris is a 5-star hotel located at 46 Avenue George V in Paris, France. The hotel, owned by the French hospitality and casino group Barrière, opened on 6 November 2006 and is a member of The Leading Hotels of the World.

The restaurant Fouquet's, known for its red awnings on the Champs-Élysées, is part of the venue. The hotel received its fifth star on 11 June 2009, and won the category of "Europe's Leading City Hotel" at the World Travel Awards in 2013.

History 
In the 1990s, the Barrière family purchased the restaurant Fouquet's, along with seven buildings surrounding the venue, in the hope of opening the group's first hotel in the French capital. Opened in 2006, the hotel was developed with the collaboration of french architect Édouard François and designer Jacques Garcia.

The hotel was closed in early 2017 to allow for renovations, and reopened on 1 July that year.

Restaurants and bars 
The venue includes 2 restaurants and 3 bars:
Fouquet's restaurant, located at 99 Avenue des Champs-Élysées
Le Joy restaurant, located at 46 Avenue George V, opening onto the inner garden of the hotel
L'Escadrille bar
Le Marta bar, which also extends on a rooftop during summertime
Le Joy bar

Literature 
The first restaurant of the establishment, which was called "The Diana" in tribute to Diane Barrière-Desseigne, is mentioned in "Hallier, L'Edernel jeune homme"  (Hallier, the Edernal young man) by Thiollet. J.P, published in 2016.

References

 Luxury hotels in Paris

Hotels in Paris
Hotel Fouquet's Barriere
Hotels established in 2006
The Leading Hotels of the World